The African dwarf frog is a genus of aquatic frog native to parts of Equatorial Africa. It is common in the pet trade and is often mistaken for the African clawed frog, a similar-looking frog in the same family. African dwarf frogs (Hymenochirus) are also known as dwarf clawed frogs. Their common name is obtained from their place of origin and the claws on their hind legs.

Distribution
African dwarf frogs occur in forested parts of equatorial Africa, from Nigeria and Cameroon in the north, and south through Gabon and east throughout the Congo River Basin.

Species
There are four species:
 Zaire dwarf clawed frog, Hymenochirus boettgeri Tornier, 1896
 Eastern dwarf clawed frog, Hymenochirus boulengeri De Witte, 1930
 Western dwarf clawed frog, Hymenochirus curtipes Noble, 1924
 Gaboon dwarf clawed frog, Hymenochirus feae Boulenger, 1906

Description
African dwarf frogs live their entire lives underwater, but need to rise to the surface to breathe air as they have lungs and not gills. These frogs are small in size and do not weigh more than a few grams. They vary in color, mostly ranging from olive green to brown with black spots. The average life expectancy of these frogs is five years, but they have been known to live longer than 20 years, and they can grow to 3 inches (7.5 cm) long. African dwarf frogs can be mistaken for and are often sold as young African clawed frogs, of the genus Xenopus, which are larger and more aggressive than the dwarf. 

All species of Pipidae are tongueless, toothless, and completely aquatic. They use their webbed feet to shove food in their mouths and down their throats, and a hyobranchial pump to draw or suck food into their mouths. Pipidae have powerful legs for swimming and lunging after food. They also use the claws on their feet to tear pieces of large food. They lack true ears, but have lateral lines running down the length of their bodies  and undersides; this is how they can sense movements and vibration in the water. They use their sensitive fingers, sense of smell, and lateral line system to find food. They are scavengers and will eat anything living, dying, or dead and any type of organic detritus.

These frogs have tiny black claws on their hind legs, which caused one of their discoverers, Oskar Boettger, to originally call them African dwarf clawed frogs, but they quickly lose these black tips in the sharp pebble environments and are more commonly called African dwarf frogs today. African Dwarf Frogs can swim up to 4 Miles per hour (6Kilometers per hour).

In the wild

This African frog habitat in the wild consists of shallow rivers, creeks, and ponds during the dry season and in the flooded areas of the forests during the wet season. These creatures prefer eating near the bottom where their coloration blends with the mud and leaf litter and they can be safe from predators.  

Males are slim and develop a small gland behind each of their front legs; this gland is not very well understood but is believed to play some part in mating. The gland is a small white spot on both sides, a minor outward bulge on both sides of the frog. Males are known to “sing” or “hum” during mating or when excited, although they sometimes “hum” even if they have no intention of mating. The females of this species are 40% larger than males when fully mature. They have pear-shaped bodies, as their abdomens fill with eggs as they reach a mating stage. Another distinction is the females have a more pronounced genital region, called an ovipositor.

African dwarf frogs mate in amplexus, during which the male grabs the female around the abdomen just in front of her back legs. The female becomes motionless, and her front limbs may twitch sporadically. Amplexus usually happens at night after one or more nights of “humming” by the male. During amplexus, the female swims, laying eggs on the surface of the water, one at a time, whilst towing the male. She swims to the bottom between layings. The male fertilizes the eggs during this time by releasing sperm into the water. Amplexus can last for several hours. When the female has laid all her eggs, she signals the male once more by going motionless, and after several minutes, the male releases the female and she returns to her normal behavior.

As pets
African dwarf frogs are commonly found as pets. They first became popular in the 1970s and have spread to the pet trade all over the world. They are desirable pets because of their low maintenance requirements compared to other amphibians. African clawed frogs are often sold erroneously as African dwarf frogs. The astute pet owner can recognize the difference, however, because: 
 Dwarf frogs have four webbed feet. African clawed frogs have webbed hind feet while their front feet have autonomous digits.
 African dwarf frogs have eyes positioned on the sides of their heads, while African clawed frogs have eyes on the tops of their heads.
 African clawed frogs have curved, flat snouts. The snout of an African dwarf frog is pointed.

African dwarf frogs are very active and rarely sit still for any period of time. When stationary, the African dwarf frog has been known to float in one spot, with its limbs completely outstretched, on the surface of the water. This is normal behavior, called "burbling". Sometimes they just float with limbs spread out, drifting on the surface. African dwarf frogs are generally peaceful with animals of their own size, but their diet sometimes include smaller animals. Fish are known to eat the eggs of these frogs. African dwarf frogs spend most of their time near the bottom of the water, where they feel safe from predators. Most frogs sleep up to 12 hours a day, provided no threat of predators is present.

These frogs are suggested to be kept in a group of two or more due to their social nature. Despite being fully aquatic, the African dwarf frog still needs to be able to reach the surface to breathe. These amphibians are not great swimmers, so water currents should be kept low and deep tanks may pose a challenge to their ability to breathe. In the wild, the Congo forest floods yearly to a depth of 24 inches or more, so any depth less than that will be suitable. They also should be kept in an enclosure with a secure cover to prevent escape and plenty of hiding spaces as in the wild they tend to be prey to a variety of animals and open spaces cause skittish behavior. The frogs eat any smaller fish. The optimum water temperature is 75–82 °F. The pH of the water should be maintained between 6.5 and 7.5. These frogs cannot survive out of water for longer than 20 minutes in low humidity, as they dry out.

Because they are fragile animals, care should be taken when handling African dwarf frogs, especially when considering them as a pet for young children. These frogs should only be held outside the tank max of 5-10 minutes, but it is better not to, for the safety of the frog.

References

External links
 The Aquarium Wiki Encyclopaedia - Aquarium care profile of this frog

Pipidae
 
Frogs of Africa
Taxa named by George Albert Boulenger